The All Japan Student Go Federation is a Japanese student Go organization for holding university Go championships. They have branches in each region (Kanto, Kansai, Kyushu, Tohoku etc.). For similar organizations, there is the American Collegiate Go Association in the United States.

Differences with other organizations
In Japan, most Go tournaments are operated by Nihon Ki-in or Kansai Ki-in. All Japan Student Go Federation and their branches are focused for university-based tournaments. They are not under direct control but have close relationship with them.

Tournaments
They are holding various tournaments with corporate sponsors.

World Students Go Oza Championship
This is a tournament to determine the student world champion since 2003. Representative players from each region (including Taiwan, Europe, Oceania etc.) will compete. The expected games in 2020 have been cancelled due to the COVID-19 outbreak.

All Japan University Go Championship

This is a team competition by each university representatives. Teams that have cleared regional preliminaries can attend. Each team can send only five members and substitute players. The sponsor is Yomiuri Shinbun (as same as Yomiuri Giants)

All Japan Female Student Honinbo

This is the only one tournament that limits participants by gender. The sponsor is Mainichi Shinbun. Some winners have eventually obtained professional status, or became top amateur players.

All Japan Student Go Best 10

This is the only one university championship that allows the attendance of high school and graduate students. It is held since 1964. The sponsor is The Asahi Shimbun.

References

External links
 Official Website
 Official Blog

1957 establishments in Japan
Board games
Japanese culture
Non-profit organizations based in Japan
Go organizations
Student organizations established in the 20th century